Harborview may refer to a location in the United States:

 Harborview, Baltimore, Maryland, a neighborhood
 Harborview, San Diego, California, a neighborhood
 Harborview Medical Center, a public hospital in King County, Washington